Ovintsy is a rural locality (a village) in Demidovskoye Rural Settlement, Gus-Khrustalny District, Vladimir Oblast, Russia. The population was 48 as of 2010.

Geography 
Ovintsy is located 43 km southwest of Gus-Khrustalny (the district's administrative centre) by road. Starkovo is the nearest rural locality.

References 

Rural localities in Gus-Khrustalny District